The Chevrolet Miray (Korean for "future") was a concept car designed, branded, and built by Chevrolet. Introduced at the 2011 Seoul Motor Show, the car shows a “mid-electric” concept.

Design

Exterior
The exterior of the Miray is made of carbon fiber and has an angled groove on the side that lighted underneath it. It has LED headlights and a dual port grill. At the rear, there are retractable flaps that give the vehicle additional airflow. The concept has aluminum-carbon fiber composite wheels that are 20 inches in the front and 21 inches in the back. Occupants enter the vehicle through scissor doors.

Interior
The interior is composed of brushed aluminum, natural leather, white fabric, and liquid metal materials. A projected instrument panel shows the performance of the Miray. The cockpit was inspired by the Chevrolet Corvette.

Functionality
Instead of traditional side mirrors, rearview cameras emerge from the side windows while a front-facing camera shows real-time video that is overlaid on the GPS navigation.

References

Miray